Acherdus or Acherdous was a deme of ancient Attica, of the phyle of Hippothontis, sending one delegate to the Boule. 

Its site is unlocated, but in the Thriasian Plain.

References

Populated places in ancient Attica
Former populated places in Greece
Demoi
Lost ancient cities and towns